Ullam is a 2005 Indian Malayalam film, directed by M. D. Sukumaran. The film stars Suresh Gopi, Geethu Mohandas, Kalasala Babu and Tony in lead roles. The film had musical score by Kaithapram.

Cast
Suresh Gopi as Kuttan 
Geethu Mohandas as Radha 
Kalasala Babu as Raman Nair 
Tony as Divakaran 
Vijayaraghavan as Maash 
Master Deepak as Appukuttan 
Bindu Ramakrishnan
Shantha Devi as Muthassi
Suraj Venjaramoodu

References

External links
  
 

2005 films
2000s Malayalam-language films